Nathan K. Reichert is a former Iowa State Representative from the 80th District. A Democrat, he served in the Iowa House of Representatives from 2005 to 2011. He received his BA from the University of Northern Colorado and MBA from the University of Iowa.

During his last term in the Iowa House, Reichert served on the Appropriations, Commerce committee, Environmental protection, and the Public Safety committees. He also served as chair of the Agriculture and Natural Resources Appropriations Subcommittee and as a member of the Administrative Rules Review Committee, the Community College Working Group of Stakeholders, the Iowa Power Fund Board, and the Renewable Fuels and Coproducts Advisory Committee.

Electoral history
*incumbent

References

External links

Representative Nathan Reichert official Iowa General Assembly site
Re-Elect Representative Nathan Reichert official campaign site
 

Democratic Party members of the Iowa House of Representatives
Living people
University of Northern Colorado alumni
University of Iowa alumni
People from Muscatine, Iowa
Year of birth missing (living people)
Place of birth missing (living people)